Copiula obsti is a species of frog in the family Microhylidae. It is endemic to the Wondiwoi Mountains in West Papua, Indonesian New Guinea. It lives under leaf litter on the forest floor. It is potentially threatened by habitat loss caused by logging.

References

obsti
Amphibians of Western New Guinea
Endemic fauna of New Guinea
Endemic fauna of Indonesia
Amphibians described in 2002
Taxonomy articles created by Polbot